Bravo F1 was a Spanish motor racing team that registered for the 1993 Formula One season, but ultimately did not compete. After the sudden death of Jean-Francois Mosnier, Bravo canceled the entry before the first race of the season. In 2010, Adrián Campos returned with Hispania Racing.

The car was to be a model designed by Nick Wirth, an improved version of the Andrea Moda S921, designated Bravo S931, and powered by Judd engines. The candidates to drive the car were Nicola Larini, Ivan Árias, Jordi Gené and Damon Hill.

This is not the first Spanish project, the predecessor was the team Pegaso España, but also unsuccessfully.

References

Formula One entrants
Formula One constructors
Spanish auto racing teams